Muhamed Hevaji Uskufi Bosnevi (born c. 1600 in Dobrnja near Tuzla, died after 1651) was a Bosnian poet and writer who used the Arebica script.

Uskufi is noted as the author of the first "Bosnian-Turkish" dictionary in 1631; Magbuli 'ari or Potur Sahidiya, one of the earliest dictionaries of the language in Bosnia. A hand-copy dating from 1798 is currently kept at the City Archive of Sarajevo. The dictionary, written in verse, contains more than 300-word explanations and over 700 words translated between Bosnian and Turkish. 

In his works, writing under the pseudonym Uskufi, Hevaji calls his language "Bosnian", and emphasizes his Bosnian descent. 

He is also the author of the religious and moral writing "Tabsirat al-'arifin" which is written partly in Turkish and partly in Bosnian, and the author of several poems in Turkish. From works written in his native tongue stand out "Ilahi bezeban-i Srb" (Nasheeds in Serbian) and "Bera- i da'vet-i iman be zeban-i Srb" (Call to Faith in Serbian). Possibly terms designating Serbian and Bosnian language in his work could be synonyms.

Legacy
Following a collaboration between the University of Oslo and the Bosnian Ministry of Education and sciences, the dictionary was reissued on national day in 2012 during a ceremony in Tuzla, the birth town of Hevaji. According to the Norwegian Slavist Svein Mønnesland, the dictionary is made relevant today not least because of politic aspects since it shows the Bosnian language to have a long tradition.

References

External links
Historijski arhiv Sarajevo 
USKUFI BOSNEVI, Muhamed Hevai Bošnjaci.net, 
Mehmet Hevayi Uskufi   
Muhamed Hukočić, Ahmet Kasumović, Ismet Smailović, "Muhamed Hevaji Uskufi", Biblioteka Baština, Sarajevo, 1990.

1600s births
Year of death unknown
Writers from Tuzla
Bosnian Muslims from the Ottoman Empire
17th-century writers from the Ottoman Empire
Bosniak writers
Bosniak poets
Bosnian language
Bosnia and Herzegovina writers